Mario Brelich (1910–1982) was an Italian author born in Budapest to an Italian father and Hungarian mother.

Works 
The Work of Betrayal. Translated by Raymond Rosenthal. (Marlboro, Vermont: Marlboro Press, 1989) .
Navigator of the Flood (Marlboro, Vermont: Marlboro Press, 1991) .
The Holy Embrace. Translated by John Shepley (Marlboro, Vermont: Marlboro Press, 1994) . Originally published as Il Sacro Amplesso (Milan: Adelphi Edizioni s.p.a., 1972).
Giuditta (Milano : Adelphi, 2008)

References

1910 births
1982 deaths
Writers from Budapest
20th-century Italian novelists
20th-century Hungarian male writers